Clashes occurred between the Levant Front and the Hamza Division, two factions of the Turkish-backed Syrian National Army, across the Turkish-occupied areas of the Aleppo Governorate on 10 October 2022, as part of the on-going civil war in Syria. On 12 October, the Sunni Islamist group Tahrir al-Sham (HTS) joined the fighting on the side of the Hamza Division, entering the Afrin region.

Background

On 7 October, gunmen shot and killed media activist Muhammad Abdul Latif, also known as Abu Ghannoum, and his wife in the city of al-Bab. The Third Legion, led by the Levant Front, found on 10 October that a group of Hamza Division fighters was responsible for the killing, sparking the clashes.

Clashes
The Third Legion launched an attack on the Hamza Division on the evening of 10 October, expelling the Hamza Division from al-Bab and capturing the group's headquarters on the outskirts of the city. The next day, additional groups joined the fighting, including Hayat Tahrir al-Sham, the Sultan Suleiman Shah Division (al-Amshat), and Ahrar al-Sham on the side of the Hamza Division, and the Liberation and Construction Movement and remnants of the Nour al-Din al-Zenki Movement on the side of the Third Legion. The Sham Legion opened the road between Afrin and the Idlib Governorate, allowing HTS to enter Afrin, taking control of Jindires on 12 October and entering Afrin city itself on 13 October. The Levant Front withdrew from Afrin towards Azaz.

Also on 13 October, HTS captured the villages of Sennarah, Anqalah and Marwaniyah in Sheikh Hadeed in the Afrin countryside and attacked the village of Kafr Jannah, but were beaten back by fighters of the Levant Front. 5 HTS fighters were killed in the attack. Furthermore, a fighter of Ahrar al-Sham was killed in clashes with Jaysh al-Islam in Susyan town in Al-Bab countryside.

On 17 October, the temporary truce between HTS and the Thirds legion broke down and heavy clashes resumed near both Afrin and Azaz, where HTS managed to capture more ground. On the same day, a fighter of the Levant front was killed and another was injured in clashes with HTS fighters near the village of Al-Khalidiyah, near Sharran in the Afrin countryside. By 18 October, at least 58 people had been killed in the clashes.

On 19 October the clashes ended as both sides reached a ceasefire agreement.

Reactions
Protests and demonstrations were held across multiple opposition controlled towns in northern Syria against the entry of HTS to the region.

See also
 Idlib Governorate clashes (June 2020)
 Tahrir al-Sham–Junud al-Sham conflict

References

2022 in Syria
Aleppo Governorate in the Syrian civil war
Northern_Aleppo_clashes
Northern_Aleppo_clashes
Military operations of the Syrian civil war involving Ahrar al-Sham
Military operations of the Syrian civil war involving Tahrir al-Sham